is a railway station operated by Ichibata Electric Railway, located in Matsue, Shimane Prefecture, Japan.

Station name 

This station was called  which consists of 18 letters and punctuation marks and is written with 23 kana (both countings exclude eki or "Station"), which was the longest in Japan. 
On April 2, 2001, the station, then called  was renamed to its previous name as the Louis C. Tiffany Garden Museum, a museum for the works of Louis Comfort Tiffany, was to open near the station. 
The station name was changed to its current name on May 21, 2007 as the museum had closed on March 31, 2007.

As of March 2020, the longest station name in Japan is currently a tie between Minamiaso Mizu-no-Umareru-Sato Hakusui-Kōgen Station on the Minami Aso Railway in Kumamoto Prefecture and Chojagahama Shiosai Hamanasu Koenmae Station on the Kashima Rinkai Railway in Ibaraki Prefecture.

This station serves Matsue English garden.

Line
Ichibata Electric Railway
Kita-Matsue Line

Station layout
There is an island platform. There are no staff on this station.

Adjacent stations

|-
!colspan=5|Ichibata Electric Railway

Notes 

Bataden Kita-Matsue Line
Louis
Railway stations in Japan opened in 1928